Cambridge & Coleridge Athletic Club (commonly referred to as C&C) is an athletic club based in Cambridge, United Kingdom.  It competes in track and field athletics, road running and cross-country. On the track, C&C is part of the Southern Men's League, the Southern Women's League and the East Anglian League. On the roads, the participates in the Frostbite Friendly League and the Kevin Henry 5K League. C&C is also a member of the Essex cross-country League.

The club is based at the University of Cambridge's athletics track on Wilberforce Road.

References

Athletics clubs in England